Leigh Thompson is the J. Jay Gerber Professor of Dispute Resolution & Organizations in the Kellogg School of Management at Northwestern University. She is the director of High Performance Negotiation Skills Executive program, the Kellogg Leading High Impact Teams Executive program and the Kellogg Team and Group Research Center. She also serves as the co-director of  the Navigating Work Place Conflict Executive program and the Constructive Collaboration Executive program.

Thompson's research has been focused on the topics of negotiation, group decision making, analogical reasoning and creativity. She has written over 130 scientific articles and book chapters. She is the author and editor of eleven books including Negotiating the Sweet Spot: The Art of Leaving Nothing on the Table,  Creative Conspiracy: The New Rules of Breakthrough Collaboration, Stop Spending, Start Managing: Strategies to Transform Wasteful Habits, Making the Team: A Guide for Managers, The Mind And Heart of the Negotiator and The Truth about Negotiation.

Thompson is a fellow of the Association for Psychological Science.

Education 
Thompson received a B.S. in Speech from Northwestern University in 1982 followed by an M.A. in Education from University of California, Santa Barbara in 1984. Subsequently, she returned to Northwestern University where she received her Ph.D. in Psychology in 1988.

Career 
After completing her Ph.D., Thompson joined the University of Washington as an Assistant Professor of Psychology. In 1994, she had a one year fellowship at the Center for Advanced Study in the Behavioral Sciences. She left University of Washington in 1995 to join Northwestern University as the John L. & Helen Kellogg Distinguished Professor of Management and Organizations and an Adjunct Professor of Psychology. In 2001, she was endowed the J. Jay Gerber Distinguished Professorship of Dispute Resolution and Organizations at Northwestern.

From 1995 to 2006, Thompson served as the director of Behavioral Research Lab at Kellogg. In 1997, she became the director of Kellogg Team and Group Research Center and the Leading High Impact Teams Executive Program. In 2013, she was appointed the director of Constructive Collaboration Executive Program.

Thompson is a fellow of the Association for Psychological Science. She has served on the selection panel of the Decision, Risk, and Management Program at the National Science Foundation and its program review committee.

Along with her work in academia, Thompson has worked as a speaker, consultant, and trainer for several companies.

Research and work 
Thompson's research is focused on the topics of creativity, innovation, teamwork and social psychology. She has also done considerable research on negotiation, focusing on how men and women negotiate, how to improve negotiation skills and the role of emotions in negotiation.

Negotiation 
Since the beginning of her career, negotiation has been a focus of Thompson's research. Initially her work on negotiation was focused on why managers often fail to reach win-win negotiation agreements. She wrote her first paper in the area in 1988 titled 'Groups as Mixed Motive Negotiations' in Advances in Group Processes: Theory & Research. In the 1990s her research discussed biases in negotiation, behavior and negotiation, and how training, experience, and feedback impacts negotiation skills. She spent most of the 1990s researching and writing about negotiation. Some of her work during this time also included perceptions of fairness in negotiation, and negotiations in teams.

In 1998, Thompson wrote the book The Mind and Heart of the Negotiator. The book discusses on how people can negotiate better. Used as an undergraduate and graduate course book, it has been translated into Mandarin, Portuguese and Korean. The 7th edition of the book was published in 2019.

In the early 2000s, Thompson began studying the impact of gender on negotiation skills. She also wrote about how negotiation can be taught and learned as a skill. Some of her research during the early 2000s in this area dealt with how emotion influences negotiation behavior and outcomes.

In 2006, Thompson edited the book, Negotiation Theory and Research and in 2008 she wrote the book, The Truth About Negotiations. Published by Financial Times Press, the book has been translated into six languages. The second edition of the book was published in 2013.

In the early and mid 2010s, Thompson's research in this area returned to teams and negotiation. In the late 2010s, Thompson conducted research on how divergent and convergent thinking can impact negotiation performance. In 2018, she conducted further research on how negotiation differs for men and women. Her research highlighted that men lie in negotiations more often than women because men approach negotiation as a competition whereas women approach it as an opportunity to build connection.

Groups, teams and creativity 
In 1996, Thompson wrote a chapter titled 'Conflict in Groups', published in Social Psychology: Handbook of Basic Principles. It marked the beginning of her research on team and group performance. She wrote about group decision making and social cognition in groups in the late 1990s. Later she conducted research on the factors that impact creativity in groups and how it can be improved.

In 2000, she wrote the book, Making the Team: A Guide for Managers. The book explains how teams should be designed to function optimally. It also highlights the skills needed to become a productive part of a team. Making the Team's 6th edition was published in 2017. It has been translated into Korean and Russian. In 2001, she wrote the book Tools for Teams.

She was the co-editor of the 2007 book Conflict in Organizational Groups: New Directions in Theory and Practice. In the late 2000s, Thompson conducted research on creativity in groups and organizational teams. She collaborated with Hoon-Seok Choi to produce an edited book, Creativity and Innovation in Organizational Teams.

In the late 2010s, some of her work in this area dealt with the topic of conflict in groups and creativity in groups. In 2013, she wrote a paper titled 'Why Teams Need a Creative Conspiracy for Success'. The paper led to the 2013 book titled The Creative Conspiracy: The New Rules of Breakthrough Collaboration. In the book she described collaborations that are conscious, planned and focused on creativity as a creative conspiracy. The book discusses keys to the kind of collaboration which makes teams more effective and how leaders can get their teams to be more creative. Reviewing the book, BusinessLIVE wrote that "her advice is practical and is applicable to everything from start-up teams trying to come up with new ideas to musicians working together to advertising account executives and creative directors developing pitches." Some of her research in this area has focused on brainstorming and how brainstorming can be made more productive. Her research highlighted that a session of brainwriting before brainstorming can increase the number of ideas generated as well as the creativity of ideas. Her research in this area has also highlighted that people can be primed for creativity by asking them to share embarrassing stories prior to brainstorming session.

Organizational behavior and social psychology 
Thompson has conducted research and written about various topics in organizational behavior and social psychology aside from her work on negotiation, teams and creativity. Her early work in this area has dealt with the evaluation of events, perception of justice, fairness and conflict resolution. Thompson co-edited the book Shared Cognition in Organizations in 1999. The book was a compilation of articles on the topic of shared knowledge. Administrative Science Quarterly reviewed the book positively and wrote that "perhaps the most admirable feat achieved in this book is the breadth of perspectives presented."

In 1999, Thompson began a collaboration with cognitive psychologists Jeffrey Loewenstein and Dedre Gentner to study analogical reasoning in managers. Her article, 'Avoiding missed opportunities in managerial life: Analogical training more powerful than individual case training' marked the beginning of several research projects focused on how to help managers apply knowledge from classroom training to business situations.

In 2003, she edited the book The Social Psychology of Organizational Behavior: Key Readings. It featured a number of articles in the field of organizational behavior, with focus on micro-organizational behavior. In 2008, Thompson wrote the book Organizational Behavior Today. The book explains key organizational behavior concepts such as the influence of people on organizations, differences between leadership and management, teamwork and levels of communication. The book has been translated into Mandarin.

In early 2010, some of Thompson's work was focused on envy at workplace and decision making in organizations. In 2016, she wrote the book Stop Spending, Start Managing: Strategies to Transform Wasteful Habits. Co-authored with Tanya Menon, the book discusses people-related problems that organizations face. Menon and Thompson interviewed one thousand managers and executives to collect data for the book. They discuss five spending traps - The Expertise Trap, The Winner's Trap, The Agreement Trap, The Communication Trap, and The Macromanagement Trap - that managers often fall into and how to avoid such situations. She discussed the key findings of the book in a Google author talk in 2017.

Online & virtual learning 
Towards the end of the 1990s, owing to the increase in the use of technology, some of Thompson's research examined electronically-mediated negotiations and how analogical encoding affects negotiation. She conducted an initial experiment examining how managers negotiate differently using email versus face-to-face negotiations. She conducted more studies that examined texting versus email negotiations.

In 2015, Thompson created a 'video-shorts' series that provided 3-minute practical advice to managers on how to brainstorm, negotiate, and develop team charters. Soon after, Thompson developed a sub-hour best practice video series called, “Negotiation 101” and “Teamwork 101” that was also publicly available.  In 2015, Thompson developed a MOOC titled High Performance Collaboration: Leadership Teamwork and Negotiation. The course available through Coursera teaches leadership skills, negotiation strategies and team management.

In 2019, Thompson developed and launched an interactive course called, 'Negotiating in a Virtual World'. She launched this in the full-time MBA program at Kellogg and also at the executive level.

Personal life 
Thompson has two sons and one daughter. She is an avid cyclist. She is a USA cycling national time trial champion. In 2010, she won a masters time trial championship at the world level.

Awards and honors 
1989 - S. Rains Wallace Dissertation Award, American Psychological Association
1991 - Presidential Young Investigator Award, National Science Foundation
1996 - Fellow, American Psychological Society
1998 - Best paper award, Academy of Management (Conflict Division)
2001 - Best paper award, International Association of Conflict Management 
2008 - Most Influential Paper (2000-2003), Academy of Management Conflict Management Division
2009 - Fellow, Society for Experimental Social Psychologists
2015 – Emerald Literati Network Award
2019 – Best paper Award, International Association of Conflict Management

Selected publications

Books 
Shared Cognition in Organizations: The Management of Knowledge (1999) 
Tools for Teams (2000) 
The Social Psychology of Organizational Behavior (2002) 
Creativity and Innovation in Organizational Teams (2005) 
Negotiation Theory and Research (2006) 
Organizational Behavior Today (2007) 
Conflict in Organizational Groups: New Directions in Theory and Practice (2007) 
The Truth About Negotiations (2nd Edition) (2013) 
Creative Conspiracy: The New Rules of Breakthrough Collaboration (2013) 
Stop Spending, Start Managing: Strategies to Transform Wasteful Habits (2016) 
Making the Team: A Guide for Managers (6th Edition) (2017) 
The Mind And Heart of the Negotiator (7th Edition) (2019) 
Negotiating the Sweet Spot: The Art of Leaving Nothing on the Table (2020) ISBN 978-1-4002-1743-4

Articles 
Thompson, L. & Hastie, R. (1990). Social perception in negotiation. Organizational Behavior & Human Decision Processes, 47, 98-123.
Thompson, L., Loewenstein, J. and Gentner, D. (2000). Avoiding missed opportunities in managerial life: Analogical training more powerful than individual case training. Organization Behavior and Human Decision Processes, 82 (1), 60-75.
Kray, L., Reb, J., Galinsky, A. & Thompson, L. (2004). Stereotype reactance at the bargaining table: The effect of stereotype activation and power on claiming and creating value. Personality and Social Psychology Bulletin, 30 (4), 399-411.
Choi, H.S. & Thompson, L. (2005). Old wine in a new bottle: Impact of membership change on group creativity. Organization Behavior and Human Decision Processes, 98 (2), 121-132. 
Smith, E. B., Menon, T., Thompson, L. (2012). Status differences in the cognitive activation of social networks. Organization Science, 23 (1), 67-82.

References 

Kellogg School of Management faculty
Northwestern University alumni
University of California, Santa Barbara alumni
Living people
Year of birth missing (living people)